The 2019-20 Miami RedHawks men's ice hockey season was the 42nd season of play for the program and the 7th in the NCHC conference. The RedHawks represented Miami University and were coached by Chris Bergeron, in his 1st season.

On March 12, 2020, NCHC announced that the tournament was cancelled due to the coronavirus pandemic, before any games were played.

Roster

As of June 28, 2019.

Standings

Schedule and Results

|-
!colspan=12 style=";" | Regular Season

|-
!colspan=12 style=";" | 
|- align="center" bgcolor="#e0e0e0"
|colspan=12|Tournament Cancelled

Scoring Statistics

Goaltending statistics

Rankings

Players drafted into the NHL

2020 NHL Entry Draft

† incoming freshman

References

Miami RedHawks men's ice hockey seasons
Miami RedHawks 
Miami RedHawks 
Miami RedHawks 
Miami RedHawks